Marcin Drzymont (born 16 September 1981 in Sosnowiec) is a Polish football player.

External links
 

1981 births
Living people
Polish footballers
Zagłębie Sosnowiec players
Odra Wodzisław Śląski players
Lech Poznań players
Korona Kielce players
Skra Częstochowa players
Association football defenders
People from Sosnowiec
Sportspeople from Silesian Voivodeship